Seiodidae is a family of mites in the order Mesostigmata.

Species
Seiodidae contains one genus, with two recognized species:

 Genus Seiodes Berlese, 1887
 Seiodes histricinus Berlese, 1892
 Seiodes ursinus Berlese, 1887

References

Mesostigmata
Acari families